The Chytridiaceae are a family of fungi in the order Chytridiales.  The family contains 33 genera and 238 species according to a 2008 estimate.

Genera

Chytridium
Cylindrochytrium
Dangeardia
Dangeardiana
Dendrochytridium
Irineochytrium
Loborhiza
Macrochytrium
Nowakowskia
Phlyctochytrium
Physorhizophidium
Polyphagus
Polyphlyctis
Pseudopileum
Rhopalophlyctis
Saccomyces
Scherffeliomyces
Scherffeliomycopsis
Septosperma
Solutoparies
Sparrowia
Sporophlyctidium
Sporophlyctis
Dinochytrium
Zygorhizidium

References

Chytridiomycota
Fungus families